Tlalocite is a rare and complex tellurate mineral with the formula Cu10Zn6(TeO4)2(TeO3)(OH)25Cl · 27 H2O. It has a Mohs hardness of 1, and a cyan color. It was named after Tlaloc, the Aztec god of rain, in allusion to the high amount of water contained within the crystal structure. It is not to be confused with quetzalcoatlite, which often looks similar in color and habit.

Occurrence 
Tlalocite was first identified in the Bambollite mine (La Oriental), Moctezuma, Municipio de Moctezuma, Sonora, Mexico and it was approved by the IMA in 1974. It often occurs together with tenorite, azurite, malachite and tlapallite. It is found in partially oxidized portions of tellurium-bearing hydrothermal veins.

References 

Copper(II) minerals
Zinc minerals
Tellurite and selenite minerals
Tellurate and selenate minerals
Hydroxide minerals
Orthorhombic minerals
Minerals described in 1974